Woodley Noel Burrows (27 March 1911 – 11 June 1997) was an Australian rules footballer who played with Collingwood in the Victorian Football League (VFL).

Burrows enlisted to serve in World War II in July 1942 and served until the ended of the war.

Notes

External links 

Noel Burrows's profile at Collingwood Forever

1911 births
1997 deaths
Australian rules footballers from Melbourne
Collingwood Football Club players
Australian Army personnel of World War II
Australian Army soldiers
People from Malvern, Victoria
Military personnel from Melbourne
People educated at Xavier College